Simham Navvindi is a 1983 Telugu-language comedy film, produced by Nandamuri Harikrishna under the Ramakrishna Cine Studios banner and directed by D. Yoganand. It stars the Chief Minister of Andhra Pradesh, his father, Kala Ranjani  and music composed by Chakravarthy. The film was remade in Tamil as Raja Mariyadhai in 1987.

Plot
Narashimham an industrialist, is a chronic bachelor as he develops a hatred towards marriage. He behaves like a dictator in the office and his word is an ordinance to everyone. Balakrishna is his Assistant Manager, who gets his appreciation more than anyone because he is a hard worker as well as he too a bachelor. Balakrishna loves a beautiful girl Radha. He postpones their marriage until he gets a promotion. Unfortunately, due to the pressure of Radha's father Parvathalu, he secretly marries Radha in a temple. Parvathalu does not allow them to stay together until he gets the promotion. So, Balakrishna makes a plan and takes Radha to honeymoon in the name of a pilgrimage. In the office, he takes leave by lying that his grandmother expired. During their journey, unexpectedly, their vehicle come to repair. So, that night unknowingly they stay at their office guest house. Next day, Narasimham visits the same guest house on office work. He sees Radha alone in the guest house. When he questions her, she bluffs that she came on the interview and she has to stay there for a night. But Narasimham does not believe that and thinks that she has eloped from the house towards her love interest. With the help of guest house watchman Lingaiah and his wife Kanakamma, Balakrishna somehow manages the situation and hides in their quarters. Narasimham offers a job for Radha and appoints her as his personal secretary. After that, Balakrishna makes various plans to set Radha free from Narasimham, but fails. Seeing this, Radha blames Narasimham that he is doing all these things because of some bad intention. Narasimham slaps Radha and reveals his past. He used to have a niece who has been trapped and cheated by a rogue in the name of love, for which she committed suicide. That's why he gets affectionate towards Radha and takes care of her. Radha also gets emotionally closer towards him. She says to Balakrishna that it is better to reveal the truth and Narasimham will understand them. But when Radha learns that Narasimham hates liars, she becomes frightened. So, both of them escape from that place, Narasimham gives a police complaint and also announces a reward for people who find Radha. The police and public are behind them. At last, they are caught by police and presented before Narasimham. Finally, Balakrishna accepts his mistake, resigns to his job and asks for pardon. Narasimham rejects it, gives him the promotion and makes a big laugh.

Cast
N. T. Rama Rao as Narasimham
Nandamuri Balakrishna as Balakrishna
Kala Ranjani as Radha
Allu Ramalingaiyah as Parvathalu
Nutan Prasad as Lingaiah
Thyagaraju 
Rallapalli as Gantaiah
KK Sarma as Girisam
Prabha as Swapna
Annapurna as Balakrishna's grandmother
Mamatha as Kanakamma
Kakinada Shymala as Narasimham's sister
Sri Lakshmi as Buchamma

Soundtrack

Music composed by Chakravarthy. Music released on AVM Audio Company.

Other
 VCDs and DVDs on - Universal Videos, SHALIMAR Video Company, Hyderabad

References

External links
 

1983 films
Indian drama films
Films scored by K. Chakravarthy
Films directed by D. Yoganand
1980s Telugu-language films
Telugu films remade in other languages
1983 drama films